Ramonda nathaliae, also known as Natalie's ramonda ( /), is a species of flowering plant in the genus Ramonda that grows in Serbia, North Macedonia (mostly in the east of both countries) and Greece (Kilkis prefecture). The flower is considered a symbol of the Serbian Army's struggle during World War I. The plant was scientifically described in 1884 from specimens growing around Niš, by Sava Petrović and Josif Pančić, who named it after Queen Natalija Obrenović.

It grows from rocks at an angle, allowing rainwater to run off the surface of the leaves. In late spring, clusters of flat, lilac blue flowers rise from basal rosettes of rounded crenate evergreen leaves. In cultivation in the UK this plant has gained the Royal Horticultural Society’s Award of Garden Merit.

See also
List of Balkan endemic plants

References

External links 
Special Nature Reserve "Jelašnička Gorge"
Gardeners' World

Didymocarpoideae
Flora of Europe
Flora of Serbia
Plants described in 1884